Louis Henry Nicolas Thiry (15 February 1935 – 27 June 2019) was a French concert organist, composer and pedagogue. He was professor of organ at the Regional Conservatoire in Rouen and played in concerts internationally. His many recordings include the complete organ works of Olivier Messiaen in 1972, which received several awards and led the composer to describe him as "an extraordinary organist". Thiry was blind.

Biography 
From 1956, he studied at the Paris Conservatoire with Rolande Falcinelli, graduating in 1958 with a first prize in organ playing and improvisation.

He was titular organist of the 1732 Lefebvre organ at the chapel of the Charles Nicole Hospital, part of the University Hospital in Rouen. He was professor of organ in Metz where one of his students was Bernard-Marie Koltès, and held the same position at the  where his students included Alain Mabit, Céline Frisch and Benjamin Alard.

He took part in many international festivals, including Lille, the Besançon Festival, the Festival of Paris, Haarlem, Venice and the 1982 Messiaen Festival in Moscow.

Thiry died on 27 June 2019 in Mont-Saint-Aignan.

Recordings 
Thiry recorded the complete organ works of Olivier Messiaen in 1972 at St. Pierre Cathedral in Geneva for Calliope. The composer Olivier Messiaen wrote about him: 

The recording was awarded the Prize of the Président of the Republic, the Shock of Le Monde de la musique and the Grand Prix du Disque of l'Académie Charles Cros). It was reissued in 2018. In Thiry's obituary in Le Monde, Marie-Aude Roux described the recording as "still considered one of the great achievements in the history of records" ("toujours considéré comme l'une des grandes réalisations de l'histoire du disque").

Thiry also recorded works by Bach, the Well Tempered Clavier at the Église Réformée d’Auteuil in 1975, and in 1993 The Art of Fugue at the organ of the Église Saint-Thomas in Strasbourg, built by Johann Andreas Silbermann in 1741. In 2004, he recorded arrangements for organ of medieval and Renaissance music by Guillaume de Machaut, Guillaume Dufay and Josquin Des Pres on the Lefebvre organ in Rouen. A reviewer noted that it was successful due to "the quality of the instrument on one hand, and Thiry's intelligent use of it."

References

External links 
 Louis Thiry (Organ) Bach Cantatas Website 2008
 Louis Thiry's discography
 

1935 births
2019 deaths
People from Meurthe-et-Moselle
Organ improvisers
French classical organists
French male organists
Blind classical musicians
21st-century organists
21st-century French male musicians
Conservatoire de Paris alumni
French blind people
20th-century classical musicians
20th-century French male musicians
Male classical organists
Blind academics